Bhanushali is a Hindu community. The majority reside in Kutch district of the Indian state of Gujarat. Some are also found in the Saurashtra region and other parts of Gujarat. Some have also moved to Thane and Mumbai region of Maharashtra and speak Marathi.

History
The Bhanushali are chiefly farmers and traders. Although they claim to be of Kshatriya descent. Jyotindra Jain theorized that the Bhanushalis migrated to Gujarat from, based on their worship of Hinglaj Mata. He also believed that the Lohanas and Bhanushalis shared a before their migration to Gujarat

Communities 
Bhanushalis are at present divided in to two subgroups, according to where they live. The Kutchhi Bhanushali Community (have ancestry in Kutch region) and Halai Bhanushali Community (have ancestry in Halar (Jamnagar) region).

Occupation 
Bhanushalis are mainly involved in agriculture and farming.

Religion 
Bhanushalis worship different kuldevis as per their clan names / surnames. They follow Hindu customs and beliefs. They also worship Veer Dada Jashraj and claim, like Lohanas, that he belonged to their community. Bhanushalis chiefly worship Hinglaj, whose main temple, Hinglaj Mata mandir is in Baluchistan, their ancestral home.

Lohanas
Bhanushalis shared their early home in Sind with Lohanas and seem to share history. Like Lohanas, Bhanushalis are involved in trading and gained visibility in business. Like Lohanas they worship Dada Jashraj as their kuladevata and Harkor, as Kuldevi. Many Bhanushalis surnames are also found among Lohana community.

Notable people 
 Shyamji Krishna Verma, Indian revolutionary fighter of Bhanushali community from Mandvi Kutch
 Odhavram, Torch bearer for educating Bhanushali Clan
 Dhvani Bhanushali, Indian Singer
 Jay Bhanushali, Indian television actor
 Kishore Bhanushali, Indian actor and stand-up comedian
 Siddharth Bhanushali, Indian Youtuber
 Vinod Bhanushali, Founder - Bhanushali Studios Ltd (BSL) & Hitz Music
 Bhavin Bhanushali, Indian actor
 Dr.Dhaval G Bhanusali, MD Dermatologist in New York City

References

Indian castes
Hindu communities
Social groups of Gujarat
Vaishya community